Samir Gogna, known professionally as Sam YG  (short for Samir Young Guy), and also known as his character Shivaker (born August 18, 1984), is a Filipino radio and television personality. He is the one of the three Boys Night Out hosts on Magic 89.9 along with Tony Toni and Slick Rick. He was also a co-host for Eat Bulaga!.

Early and personal life
Gogna was born and raised in the Philippines; he is a fourth-generation Indian Filipino: his family are Catholics originating from Jaipur, India. He has an older brother and a younger sister.

Gogna attended Ateneo de Manila University from grade school to college. Gogna aspired to become a lawyer when he was a teenager, which led him to pursue a degree in legal management.

Gogna became a target of bullying during his youth because he was Indian. His peers called him Bumbay (Filipino ethnic slur for Indians), 5-6 (Indian loan shark) and mabaho (Tagalog for "smelly") based on Filipino stereotypes about Indians.

In April 2010, Gogna gave up his Indian nationality and became a Filipino citizen.

Career
In 2003, 19-year-old Samir Gogna successfully auditioned for the Junior Jock program of Magic 89.9. Being the youngest among the Junior Jocks, his bosses nicknamed him "Young Guy", which he adopted into his radio name, Sam YG (Samir Young Guy).
 
After graduating from Ateneo de Manila University, Gogna worked with several television networks including Hero, Studio 23's Wazzup Wazzup, QTV, and CNN Philippines.

In 2006, he became a DJ for Magic 89.9. He joined Tony Toni and Slick Rick in Boys' Night Out, taking the place of King DJ Logan. Shivaker, Sam YG's alter ego, first appeared in Boys' Night Out. Shivaker was an Indian love guru who wore a turban and spoke with a thick Indian accent. In 2009, Shivaker had his first television appearance in Cool Center as a relationship expert. In August 2009, Shivaker and Tony Toni appeared as contestants in the Eat Bulaga! segment, "Pinoy Henyo". The studio audience were so fascinated with Shivaker that he was invited to be a host of Eat Bulaga!; he also became a host of Diz Iz It!. In July 2015, he was featured on the cover of Men's Health Philippines. In January 2016, after the last segment Dancing in Tandem replacing ATM with the Baes, Sam YG departed Eat Bulaga! to focus on his career as a DJ.

Filmography

Television

Radio
 Sam vs. Sam (99.5 RT, 2005–06, with Sam Oh)
 Boys Night Out (Magic 89.9, 2006–present)

Notes and references
Notes

References

External links

 

1984 births
Living people
People from Quezon City
Filipino radio personalities
Filipino people of Indian descent
Filipino television variety show hosts
VJs (media personalities)
Radio Philippines Network personalities
GMA Network personalities
Ateneo de Manila University alumni